The 2017 Rugby Africa season contains a series of rugby union tournaments scheduled for 2017 and organised by the governing body of rugby union in Africa, Rugby Africa. The top-tier event is the Rugby Africa Gold Cup – formerly simply known as the Africa Cup – a six-team competition which was played on a round-robin basis from June to August 2017.

Competitions 

As in previous Africa Cup seasons, all participating teams were divided into multiple tiers. For 2017, a restructuring and subsequent rebranding occurred as follows:

 Gold Cup: the tier 1 event. This competition was played on a round-robin basis from 24 June to 5 August 2017.
 Silver Cup: the tier 2 event. The three highest-ranked non-finalists from Division 1B – ,  and  – were joined by Division 1C champions  for a tournament that was held between 5 and 8 July 2017.
 Bronze Cup: the tier 3 event. The Bronze Cup consisted of six teams, divided into a Group North and a Group South.
 Regional Challenge: the lowest tier of African rugby.

In addition to the main fifteens tournaments, an Under-20 competition featuring eight teams was held in April and a rugby sevens tournament involving twelve teams was held in November. A women's rugby sevens tournament is also to be scheduled.

Teams 

The following teams will take part in the 2017 Rugby Africa season.

Rankings are taken from the start of each division

Gold Cup 

The 2017 Gold Cup doubles as qualification for the 2019 Rugby World Cup. The last place team will be relegated to the 2018 Silver Cup and eliminated from World Cup qualification.

Standings 

The final standings in the 2017 Rugby Africa Gold Cup were:

Matches 

The following matches were played in the 2017 Rugby Africa Gold Cup:

Round one

Round two

Round three

Round four

Round five

Round six

Round seven

Silver Cup 

The 2017 Silver Cup doubles as qualification for the 2019 Rugby World Cup. Winner gets promoted to the 2018 Gold Cup, while all other teams will be eliminated from World Cup qualification.

Bracket

Matches

Bronze Cup

Group North

Standings 
Cameroon were suspended and Nigeria withdrew. Algeria finished first.
The final standings in the 2017 Rugby Africa Bronze Cup Group North were:

Matches 

The Bronze Cup North fixtures were originally to be played in Yaoundé in May 2017, with Cameroon also present, but had been postponed through lack of organization that Rugby Africa disqualified Cameroon and suspended the activity of the country's federation for three months. The matches will now be a home-and-home series between Algeria and Nigeria, with dates to be determined.

Nigeria also withdrew, so Algeria face Zambia in a one off fixture on 4 November.

Group South

Standings 

The final standings in the 2017 Rugby Africa Bronze Cup Group South were:

Matches 

All matches were held at Lusaka Rugby Club Show Grounds, Lusaka, Zambia.

Final Winner North vs Winner South 

Match at Mufulira, Zambia.

Regional Challenge

Group West 1

Standings 

The final standings in the 2017 Rugby Africa Regional Challenge Group West 1 were:

Matches 

All matches will be held at Accra Sports Stadium, Accra, Ghana.

Group West 2

Standings 

The final standings in the 2017 Rugby Africa Regional Challenge Group West 2 were:

Matches

Group Centre 

Gabon was originally intended to participate, but withdrew. The match between Burundi and DR Congo was to be played on 7 October in Bujumbura, Burundi, but with DR Congo not showing up for the match, the match was declared forfeit and DR Congo faced the possibility of suspension.

Group South

Standings 

The final standings in the 2017 Rugby Africa Regional Challenge Group South were:

Matches 

The fixtures for the 2017 Rugby Africa Regional Challenge Group South will be played from 15–21 October in Mafeteng, Lesotho.

See also 

 Africa Cup
 2019 Rugby World Cup – Africa qualification

References

External links 
 

2017
2017 rugby union tournaments for national teams
2017 in African rugby union